According to Wikipedia. Tadjrouna is a town and commune in Laghouat Province, Algeria. According to the 1998 census, it has a population of 3,597.

References

Communes of Laghouat Province
Algeria
Cities in Algeria